The Görlitz Synagogue in Görlitz, Germany was built between 1909 and 1911 in the Art Nouveau style and was the main place of worship for the city's Jewish community. Despite an arson attack, the synagogue was one of the few synagogues in the area to survive Kristallnacht, sustaining only minor damage. The damage could have been greater, but was lessened because the firefighters ignored the orders to let the synagogue burn. With the city's Jewish population depleted, the unused synagogue became a ruin in the following decades. In 1991, a restoration project began which was completed in December 2020. Owing to the COVID-19 pandemic, the opening ceremony was postponed until 2021. The synagogue duly opened on July 12, 2021. On September 12, 2022 a new Magen David was placed on top of the synagogue.

History 
The Jewish community in Görlitz grew from 150 residents in 1852 to 643 residents in 1880. The Old Synagogue (Langenstrasse) in the historic part of the town (which still stands and is used as a house of literature) became too small for the growing Jewish community. The architects William Lossow and Max Hans Kühne (famous for designing the main train station in Leipzig) made architectural plans for the new synagogue in Görlitz. They chose Art Nouveau as the leading style of the building, which differed from the more oriental-looking style of synagogues of that time. After two years' construction, the synagogue was opened on March 7, 1911.

From 1933 to 1945 under the reign of Nazi Germany, Jews fled Görlitz and/or were deported. The synagogue survived Kristallnacht on November 9, 1938 without major structural damage. The arson attack wasn't foiled, but the fire was extinguished by the fire department before any severe damage was done to the building's structure. The final religious service took place in September 1940. 

After World War II, the Soviet military administration transferred ownership to the nearby Jewish community in Dresden. The small community in Dresden couldn't afford the maintenance costs of the building and sold it back to the Görlitz city administration (GDR) in November, 1963.

After German reunification, funds were raised and efforts undertaken to save the building from collapse. The restoration between 1991 and 2020 cost approximately 10 million Euros.

The 70th anniversary of the Kristallnacht pogrom was commemorated by the Görlitz City Council, through the synagogue support group Förderkreis Görlitzer Synagoge, e. V., on November 9, 2008.

The synagogue is in fact two synagogues: the Kuppelsaal, originally with room for about 550 worshippers, has been restored to accommodate 310 visitors; and the Wochentags-Synagogue,
with room originally for approximately 50 worshippers, can now accommodate 20. The city council has decided that the Wochentags-Synagogue will be retained for Jewish worship.

There remains no large Jewish community in Görlitz that would require full use of the synagogue, and as such the Kuppelsaal will be used for tours to show the Jewish history of Görlitz and can be booked for events and conferences. 

On August 20, 2021 the first jewish worship after 80 years was held in the synagogue.

On December 16, 2021 fragments of the Torah scroll believed lost in the pogrom night were handed over to the city of Görlitz. They were in the custody of the Kunnerwitz priest for over 50 years.

Reconstructing the Magen David (Star of David) 
The Magen David on the roof of the synagogue was broken off and destroyed the day after Kristallnacht. After the Jewish Community of Dresden sold the building to the Görlitz city administration in November 1963, the building wasn't consecrated anymore. Plans for restoration in the early 90s didn't intend to re-install the Magen David. Discussions between the city and the FGS about the rebuilding of the Magen David in 2008 were blocked by the city administration. At that time, the cost of rebuilding the Magen David was estimated to €13,000. With an open letter of the society for promoting the synagogue (Förderkreis Görlitzer Synagoge e.V.) in mid-2020, discussions about re-installing the Magen David began again.

For several years the Jewish community in Dresden declined to support a re-installation. This opinion has changed in 2017. Both the city administration and the Jewish community now support the idea of a new Magen David.

Because of roof refurbishment that took place in the 1990s before opinion shifted, there wasn't structural support present to install the Magen David. Structural engineers will be commissioned to find a proper solution. The findings were positive - the Magen David can be constructed on top of the roof. It is planned to cover the estimated costs of €70,000 entirely by donations. The musician and chairman of the Jewish Community in Görlitz Alex Jacobowitz agreed to donate a five-digit amount  In May 2021 an anonymous donor donated the full €70,000 to the city. The City Administration estimates that the Magen David should be restored in 2022. 

On September 12, 2022 a new Magen David was placed on top of the synagogue.

Gallery

Literature 

 Alex Jacobowitz:The New Synagogue in Görlitz, first edition, Verlag Hentrich & Hentrich (Publisher), Berlin, 2021. .

References 
 The New Synagogue in Görlitz, Alex Jacobowitz, first edition, Verlag Hentrich & Hentrich (Publisher), Berlin, 2021. 
 Die Neue Görlitzer Synagoge, Alex Jacobowitz, Erstausgabe, Verlag Hentrich & Hentrich, Berlin, 2021. 
 
 

Synagogues in Germany
Buildings_and_structures_in_Görlitz
Görlitz